William Kyle Carpenter (born October 17, 1989) is a medically retired United States Marine who received the United States' highest military honor, the Medal of Honor, for his actions in Marjah, Helmand Province, Afghanistan in 2010. Carpenter is the youngest living Medal of Honor recipient.

Early life
Carpenter was born in Jackson, Mississippi on October 17, 1989, and raised in Flowood by his parents James and Robin. He is a graduate of W.W. King Academy in Batesburg, South Carolina. He enlisted in the Marine Corps' delayed entry program at age 19 in February 2009, and completed Recruit Training in July 2009 at Marine Corps Recruit Depot, Parris Island, South Carolina.

Military career

Carpenter completed his initial training at the Camp Geiger School of Infantry, Marine Corps Base Camp Lejeune, North Carolina. In July 2010, as a Private First Class, he was assigned to Fox Company, 2nd Battalion, 9th Marines, Regimental Combat Team One, 1st Marine Division (Forward), 1st Marine Expeditionary Force (Forward), in Helmand Province, Afghanistan in support of Operation Enduring Freedom, where he served as a Squad Automatic Weapon (SAW) gunner beginning September 2009.

On November 21, 2010, Carpenter and another Marine, Nick Eufrazio, were manning a rooftop security post during defense of the village of Marjah, Helmand Province from a Taliban attack. According to his Medal of Honor citation,

Carpenter's jaw and right arm were shattered, and he lost his right eye and most of his teeth; he has undergone dozens of surgeries.
In July 2013, he was medically retired as a Corporal.

On June 19, 2014,  Carpenter received the Medal of Honor in a ceremony at the White House.
He is the eighth living recipient to be awarded the Medal of Honor for actions in Afghanistan.

Medal of Honor citation

Post-military career 
After his July 2013 medical retirement, Carpenter enrolled at the University of South Carolina in Columbia, and received a degree in international studies in 2017. He is a 2013 initiate of the Chi-Omega chapter of the Kappa Sigma Fraternity at the University of South Carolina.

In 2019, Carpenter co-authored a book with Don Yaeger titled You Are Worth It: Building a Life Worth Fighting For about the events leading up to his becoming a Medal of Honor recipient.

Personal life 
Carpenter is married.

Awards and decorations

Fundraising
Carpenter appeared in a video, "Still in the Fight," to raise money for the Fisher House Foundation, which provides free and low-cost housing to veterans and families receiving treatment at military hospitals.

See also
 List of post-Vietnam Medal of Honor recipients

References

Further reading
Medal of Honor: 150 Years of Courage and Sacrifice. Clearwater, FL: Belmont International Incorporated, 2011. 
Owens, Ron. Medal of Honor: Historical Facts & Figures. Paducah, Ky: Turner, 2004.

External links

Official website
President Obama Awards the Medal of Honor to Corporal William "Kyle" Carpenter
Kyle Carpenter interview

1989 births
Living people
United States Marine Corps personnel of the War in Afghanistan (2001–2021)
American people with disabilities
People from Flowood, Mississippi
United States Marine Corps non-commissioned officers
War in Afghanistan (2001–2021) recipients of the Medal of Honor
United States Marine Corps Medal of Honor recipients